Nhat Nguyen (born 16 June 2000) is an Irish badminton player. Born in Vietnam, Nguyen left the country for a new life in Dublin, Ireland along with his parents and older sister, when he was six years old. Then, he started playing badminton at the local club with his father. He was the gold medalist at the 2016 European U17 Championships in the boys' singles event, and also won the bronze medal in the doubles event partnered with Paul Reynolds. At the same year, he clinched the men's singles title at the Irish National Championships. Nguyen won his first senior international title at the Polish International in the men's doubles event with Reynolds, after that the men's singles title at the Welsh International.

Achievements

European Junior Championships 
Boys' singles

BWF International Challenge/Series 
Men's singles

Men's doubles

  BWF International Challenge tournament
  BWF International Series tournament
  BWF Future Series tournament

References

External links 
 
 
 
 
 

2000 births
Living people
Irish people of Vietnamese descent
Sportspeople of Vietnamese descent
Sportspeople from Dublin (city)
Irish male badminton players
Badminton players at the 2018 Summer Youth Olympics
Badminton players at the 2020 Summer Olympics
Olympic badminton players of Ireland
Badminton players at the 2019 European Games
European Games competitors for Ireland
Irish sportspeople of Asian descent